Haifa Lee Breakwater Light  is a lighthouse in Haifa, Israel. It is located at the end of the quay serving as the inner breakwater of the Port of Haifa.

Until 2007 the light was located on top of a  white square concrete harbor control tower. Since then, the lee breakwater has been completely redeveloped and the light was moved to a  skeletal triangular radar tower.

See also

 List of lighthouses in Israel

References

Lighthouses in Israel
Buildings and structures in Haifa